The 1960 Grand National was the 114th renewal of the Grand National horse race that took place at Aintree Racecourse near Liverpool, England, on 26 March 1960. The steeplechase was won by nine-year-old Merryman II, who, at odds of 13/2, became the first clear favourite to win for 33 years. His jockey, 22-year-old Gerry Scott, had been lucky to take part in the race, having broken his collarbone two weeks prior. Merryman II became the first ever Scottish winner of the National.

The top weight was officially reduced to a maximum of 12 stone from 12 stone 7 lbs, though it had been over a decade since any horse had been asked to shoulder such a burden.

This was the first Grand National to be televised.

Finishing order

Non-finishers

Media coverage and aftermath

This was the first year that the National was broadcast live on television. The presenter, Cliff Michelmore, who stepped in at the last minute for David Coleman, who was suffering from appendicitis, told viewers they were witnessing television history. The BBC deployed 16 cameras to Aintree, with Peter O'Sullevan (who had covered the race on radio since 1947) commentating on his first of 38 televised Grand Nationals. O'Sullevan later described his nervousness at commentating on the famous race for the first time on television, his nerves amplified by a restricted view and an unreliable monitor.

Co-commentator Peter Bromley recalled, "They had built an enormous tower in the middle of the course so that we could see the majority of the action. It was so huge that the thing was swaying and I felt most unsafe. Conversely the view was excellent and having told a few chums of my position for the Foxhunters Chase two days before the National, I found the late Ryan Price's wife, Dorothy and Fred Winter's wife Di, as guests for the big race. Fred was riding Dandy Scot for Ryan and the ladies thought they would take advantage of the unique viewing position. I applauded them for even managing to climb the endless and precarious ladders up the side of the scaffolding. A further surprise almost made me drop my binoculars when Fred, who had fallen at the Canal Turn, joined us in the crows nest and the first I knew of his presence was when he tapped me on the shoulder while I was commentating and said 'Watcha Cock!"

References

External links

 1960
Grand National
Grand National
1960 in British television
20th century in Lancashire
March 1960 sports events in the United Kingdom